Blazny is a rural locality (a village) in Pertsevskoye Rural Settlement, Gryazovetsky District, Vologda Oblast, Russia. The population was 18 as of 2002.

Geography 
Blazny is located 36 km northeast of Gryazovets (the district's administrative centre) by road. Koshkino is the nearest rural locality.

References 

Rural localities in Gryazovetsky District